Thérèse Paquet-Sévigny is a Canadian diplomat who, in 1987, was the first woman permanently appointed as an Under-Secretary-General in the United Nations. She was head of the Department of Public Information. She has also been the Secretary General and Senior Advisor to Orbicom, the International Network of UNESCO Chairs in Communications.

Paquet-Sévigny was previously a vice-president of communications with the CBC. She has taught at the University of Montreal and was head of the UNESCO chair in International Development and Communication at the Université du Québec à Montréal.

References

External links
 The 1989 Southam Lecture

Canadian diplomats
Living people
Canadian women diplomats
UNESCO officials
Canadian Broadcasting Corporation people
Canadian officials of the United Nations
Year of birth missing (living people)